Rawiri Puhirake (? – 21 June 1864) was a New Zealand tribal leader. Of Māori descent, he identified with the Ngāi Te Rangi iwi. He was killed in the Battle of Te Ranga.

References

Year of birth unknown
1864 deaths
Ngāi Te Rangi people
Military leaders of the New Zealand Wars